Seydoux is a French-language surname. Notable people with the surname include:

 Camille Seydoux (born 1982), French stylist
 Balthazar Seydoux (born 1971), Monegasque politician
 François Seydoux de Clausonne (1905–1981), French diplomat
 Jacques Seydoux (1870–1929), French diplomat and economist
 Léa Seydoux (born 1985), French actress
 Léo Seydoux (born 1998), Swiss footballer
 Michel Seydoux (born 1947), French businessman and film producer
 Philippe Seydoux (born 1985), Swiss ice hockey player
 Roger Seydoux (1908–1985), French academic and diplomat

French-language surnames